Girolamo Pamphilj or Girolamo Pamphili (1544–1610) was a Roman Catholic cardinal and member of the Pamphili family.

References

1544 births
1610 deaths
17th-century Italian Roman Catholic archbishops
Girolamo
Clergy from Rome